Höntrop is a district of the City of Bochum in the Ruhr area in North Rhine-Westphalia in Germany. The population used to speak the Westphalian dialect, but now standard German is the norm. Höntrop borders inter alia to Freisenbruch, which belongs to Essen, another city, and Linden a district of Bochum. Höntrop belongs to the Stadtbezirk (district of the town) of Wattenscheid. Höntrop is a stop at the railway line S1 to Solingen via Düsseldorf and furthermore also to Dortmund and is starting- and endpoint of the tram line 310 to Heven, a part of Witten via the city of Bochum and Bochum main station.

Boroughs of Bochum